Chantrea is a district located in Svay Rieng Province, Cambodia. The district is subdivided into 10 communes and 49 villages. According to the 1998 census of Cambodia, it had a population of 45,439. The town of Chantrea was destroyed by 2,245 tons of US ordnance.

References

Districts of Svay Rieng province